Nilavariyathe is a 2017 Malayalam language film produced by Biju V Mathai and Kunjambu Nair. The film is directed by Utpal V Nayanar, and stars Anumol and Bala in the lead roles, along with Indrans, Sudheer Karamana, Kalasala Babu, Santhosh Keezhattoor and Shivani Bhai. The music is composed by Kanjangad Ramachandran. The film is based on a story written by Suraj Mavila.

Plot 
The story is based on the caste system that was prevalent in northern districts of Malabar in Kerala many years back. The story is about how the caste system affects Paata's and Pokkan's love affair. Paata and Pokkan are workers in Karikkot Tharavadu that is famous for Theyyam and Komaram plays. Paata falls in love with the young and handsome Pokkan and aspires to marry him. Kelu is the only person who will be happy to see them get married. But the caste differences play a major role such that Paata had no chance to marry Pokkan. Kelu along with Paata plans ways to ease the obstacles that are standing as blockades to the marriage.

Cast 
 Anumol as Paata                
 Bala as Pokkan        
 Shivani Bhai as Shivani
 Indrans
 Sajitha Madathil
 Mukundan
 Santhosh Keezhattoor                
 Sudheer Karamana                
 Kalasala Babu
 Sreekumar

Soundtrack 

 "Paalazhi Polulla" – Vijay Yesudas, Swetha Mohan
 "Thinkalkuriyum" – Vijay Yesudas
 "Kalichan Deive"- Kanhangad Ramachandran
 "Payyaram Kattile"- Swetha Mohan

Reception
A critic from nettv4u opined that "The movie is definitely worth a watch, in spite of the technical glitches, to gain an understanding of the social structures in the villages of Northern Kerala".

References

External links
 

2017 films
2010s Malayalam-language films
Films shot in Kozhikode
Films shot in Kannur
Films shot in Thalassery
Films scored by Kanhangad Ramachandran